This article contains a list of volcanoes and a list of protected areas associated with the Cascade Range of the Pacific Northwest of North America.

Volcanoes

Volcanoes south of the Fraser River in the Cascade Volcanic Arc (a geological term) belong to the Cascade Range (a geographic term). Peaks are listed north to south.

North Cascades

Coquihalla Mountain (southern British Columbia) — highest peak in the Bedded Range. It is a major preserved stratovolcano in the Pemberton Volcanic Belt, an extinct portion of the Canadian Cascade Arc.
Mount Baker (Near the United States-Canada border) — highest peak in northern Washington. It is an active volcano. Steam activity from its crater occurs relatively frequently. Mount Baker is one of the snowiest places on Earth; in 1999 the ski area (on a subsidiary peak) recorded the world's greatest single-season snowfall: .
Glacier Peak (northern Washington) — secluded and relatively inaccessible peak. Contrary to its name, its glacial cover is not that extensive. The volcano is surprisingly small in volume, and gets most of its height by having grown atop a nonvolcanic ridge.

High Cascades

Mount Rainier (southeast of Tacoma, Washington) — highest peak in the Cascades, it dominates the surrounding landscape. There is no other higher peak northward until the Yukon-Alaska-BC border apex beyond the Alsek River.
Mount St. Helens (southern Washington) — Erupted in 1980, leveling forests to the north of the mountain and sending ash across the northwest. The northern part of the mountain was destroyed in the blast (1980 Mount St. Helens eruption).
Mount Adams (east of Mount St. Helens) — the second highest peak in Washington and third highest in the Cascade Range.
Mount Hood (northern Oregon) — the highest peak in Oregon and arguably the most frequently climbed major peak in the Cascades.
Mount Jefferson (northcentral Oregon) — the second highest peak in Oregon.
Three Fingered Jack (northcentral Oregon) — Highly eroded Pleistocene volcano.
Mount Washington (between Santiam and McKenzie passes) — a highly eroded shield volcano.
Three Sisters (near the city of Bend, Oregon) — South Sister is the highest and youngest, with a well-defined crater. Middle Sister is more pyramidal and eroded. North Sister is the oldest and has a crumbling rock pinnacle.
Broken Top (to the southeast of South Sister) — a highly eroded extinct stratovolcano. Contains Bend and Crook Glaciers.
Newberry Volcano — isolated caldera with two crater lakes. Very variable lavas. Flows from here have reached the city of Bend.
Mount Bachelor (near Three Sisters) — a geologically young (less than 15,000 years) shield-to-stratovolcano which is now the site of a popular ski resort. (Mt. Bachelor ski area)
Mount Bailey (north of Mount Mazama)
Mount Thielsen (east of Mount Bailey) — highly eroded volcano with a prominent spire, making it the Lightning Rod of the Cascades.
Mount Mazama (southern Oregon) — better known for its Crater Lake, which is a caldera formed by a catastrophic eruption which took out most of the summit roughly 6,900 years ago. Mount Mazama is estimated to have been about  elevation prior to the blast.
Mount Scott (southern Oregon) — on the southeastern flank of Crater Lake.  At  elevation, this small stratovolcano is the highest peak in Crater Lake National Park.
Mount McLoughlin (near Klamath Falls, Oregon) — presents a symmetrical appearance when viewed from Klamath Lake.
Medicine Lake Volcano — a shield volcano in northern California which is the largest volcano by volume in the Cascades.
Mount Shasta (northern California) — second highest peak in the Cascades.
Lassen Peak (south of Mount Shasta) — southernmost volcano in the Cascades and the most easily climbed peak in the Cascades. Lowest Peak because the Cascades extend from it.

Protected areas

There are four U.S. National Parks in the Cascade Range, one National Scenic Area, and many U.S. National Monuments, U.S. Wilderness Areas, and U.S. National Forests. Each classification protects the various glaciers, volcanoes, geothermal fields, rivers, lakes, forests, and wildlife to varying degrees.

National parks
Lassen Volcanic National Park was established in 1916 while its namesake peak was erupting. The park includes the most extensive and active thermal areas in the United States outside Yellowstone National Park.
Crater Lake National Park preserves the remains of Mount Mazama, a large volcano that imploded thousands of years ago, forming a caldera that was later filled with rain and ground water, later to be known as Crater Lake.
Mount Rainier National Park surrounds the Cascades' highest volcano, Mount Rainier, which in turn is covered by the largest glacier system in the United States south of Alaska.
North Cascades National Park was carved out of a primitive part of the range composed of ancient metamorphic and sedimentary rock. Mount Baker and Glacier Peak are nearby.

National Scenic Areas
Columbia River Gorge National Scenic Area

National monuments
Mount St. Helens National Volcanic Monument was formed following the 1980 eruption of Mount St. Helens in order to preserve the devastated area and give scientists a chance to study its recovery.
Newberry National Volcanic Monument includes the area around Newberry Volcano in central Oregon.
Cascade–Siskiyou National Monument is located in southern Oregon at the junction of the Cascades and the Siskiyou Mountains.
Lava Beds National Monument in California lies on the northeast flank of the Medicine Lake Volcano and is the site of the largest concentration of lava tubes in the United States.

Provincial Parks
Skagit Valley Provincial Park
E. C. Manning Provincial Park
Cascade Recreation Area
Cathedral Provincial Park and Protected Area
Coquihalla Canyon Provincial Park
Chilliwack Lake Provincial Park
Coquihalla Summit Recreation Area
Silver Lake Provincial Park
Nicolum River Provincial Park
Skihist Provincial Park
Bridal Veil Falls Provincial Park
Cultus Lake Provincial Park

Wilderness areas 

 Wenatchee National Forest Wilderness Areas
 Alpine Lakes Wilderness
 Glacier Peak Wilderness
 Henry M. Jackson Wilderness
 Lake Chelan-Sawtooth Wilderness
 Norse Peak Wilderness
 William O. Douglas Wilderness
 Goat Rocks Wilderness
 Gifford Pinchot National Forest Wilderness Areas
 Goat Rocks Wilderness
 Tatoosh Wilderness
 Mount Adams Wilderness
 Indian Heaven Wilderness
 Trapper Creek Wilderness
 William O. Douglas Wilderness
 Mount Baker-Snoqualmie National Forest Wilderness Areas
 Alpine Lakes Wilderness
 Boulder River Wilderness
 Clearwater Wilderness
 Glacier Peak Wilderness
 Henry M. Jackson Wilderness
 Mount Baker Wilderness
 Noisy-Diobsud Wilderness
 Norse Peak Wilderness
 Wild Sky Wilderness
Mount Hood National Forest Wilderness Areas
Badger Creek Wilderness
Bull of the Woods Wilderness
Mark O. Hatfield Wilderness
Mount Hood Wilderness
Salmon–Huckleberry Wilderness
Deschutes National Forest Wilderness Areas
Diamond Peak Wilderness
Mount Jefferson Wilderness
Mount Thielsen Wilderness
Mount Washington Wilderness
Three Sisters Wilderness
Willamette National Forest Wilderness Areas
Opal Creek Wilderness
Middle Santiam Wilderness
Menagerie Wilderness
Waldo Lake Wilderness
Umpqua National Forest Wilderness Areas
Boulder Creek Wilderness
Rogue River – Siskiyou National Forest Wilderness Areas
Sky Lakes Wilderness
Rogue–Umpqua Divide Wilderness
Fremont–Winema National Forests Wilderness Areas
Mountain Lakes Wilderness
Shasta-Trinity National Forest Wilderness Areas
Mount Shasta Wilderness
Lassen National Forest Wilderness Areas
Caribou Wilderness
Ishi Wilderness
Thousand Lakes Wilderness

Natural history
Cascades Ecoregion
Ecology of the North Cascades
Flora of the Cascade Range

References

Lists of mountains of the United States
Nature-related lists
British Columbia geography-related lists
California geography-related lists
Oregon geography-related lists
Washington (state) geography-related lists